Coronium is a genus of sea snails, marine gastropod mollusks in the family Muricidae, the murex snails or rock snails.

Species 
Species within the genus Coronium include:

 Coronium acanthodes (Watson, 1882)
 Coronium coronatum (Penna-Neme & Leme, 1978)
 Coronium elegans Simone, 1996
 Coronium oblongum Simone, 1996
 Coronium wilhelmense (Ramirez Bohme, 1981)

References 

 
Trophoninae